Park Meadows is an enclosed shopping mall in Lone Tree, Colorado. Opened on August 30, 1996, the mall features  Forever 21, JCPenney, Dillard's, Nordstrom, Macy's, Crate and Barrel and Dick's Sporting Goods as its anchor stores.

History
Park Meadows opened in 1996 with Dillard's, and the first Nordstrom in the state of Colorado. Both Foley's (now Macy's) and Joslins opened at the mall in 1997, and JCPenney opened in 1999. It became the largest mall in the Denver metropolitan area.

When Dillard's bought the Joslins chain in 1998, the Park Meadows store was sold to Lord & Taylor, which opened in 1999. The Hahn Company, who built the mall, sold it to The Rouse Company the same year. A movie theater opened by United Artists closed in 2000 and became Galyan's, now Dick's Sporting Goods.

Lord & Taylor closed its store at the mall in 2004. Also that year, General Growth Properties acquired the mall when it bought Rouse's portfolio. In 2006, the Lord & Taylor building was demolished for an outdoor promenade.

Borders Books & Music, a tenant of the outdoor section, closed in 2011. A year later, it was replaced by Forever 21.

Anchors

Current 

 The Container Store (periphery)
 Dick's Sporting Goods (former United Artists Theatre)
 Dillard's
 Epic Mountain Gear (periphery)
 Forever XXI
 JCPenney
 Macy's
 Nordstrom
 PetSmart (periphery)

Sources:

Former 

 Border's Books & Music (now Forever XXI)
 Disney Store
 Foley's (now Macy's)
 Lord and Taylor, formerly Joslin's (demolished)
 United Artists Theatre

References

External links

Brookfield Properties
Shopping malls in Colorado
Shopping malls established in 1996
Tourist attractions in Denver
1996 establishments in Colorado